James Miller (born 4 June 1974) is a retired Australian pole vaulter.

He won the bronze medal at the 1994 Commonwealth Games, competed at the 1995 World Championships and he competed at the 1996 Summer Olympics placing 16th.

He became Australian champion in 1993, 1994, 1995, 1996 and 1997. His main domestic competitor was Simon Arkell. His personal best jump was 5.75 metres, achieved in February 1996 in Melbourne.

References

1974 births
Living people
Australian male pole vaulters
Athletes (track and field) at the 1994 Commonwealth Games
Commonwealth Games medallists in athletics
Commonwealth Games bronze medallists for Australia
Athletes (track and field) at the 1996 Summer Olympics
Olympic athletes of Australia
20th-century Australian people
Medallists at the 1994 Commonwealth Games